World Communion Sunday is a celebration observed by several Christian denominations, taking place on the first Sunday of every October, that promotes Christian unity and ecumenical cooperation. It focuses on an observance of the eucharist. The tradition was begun in 1933 by Hugh Thomson Kerr who ministered in the Shadyside Presbyterian Church. According to Presbyterian Outlook:

It was then adopted throughout the US Presbyterian Church in 1936 and subsequently spread to other denominations.  In 1940, the Federal Council of Churches (now the National Council of Churches), led by Jesse Moren Bader, endorsed World Communion Sunday and began to promote it to Christian churches worldwide.

See also

 Awareness Sunday
 Week of Prayer for Christian Unity

References

Christian ecumenism
Christian Sunday observances
Eucharist
Holidays and observances by scheduling (nth weekday of the month)
October observances